The 1981–82 FIBA European Champions Cup was the 25th season of the European top-tier level professional basketball club competition FIBA European Champions Cup (now called EuroLeague). The Final was held at the Sporthalle, in Cologne, West Germany, on March 25, 1982. Squibb Cantù defeated the defending title holders, Maccabi Elite Tel Aviv, by a result of 86–80.

Competition system

 24 teams (European national domestic league champions, plus the then current title holders), playing in a tournament system, entered a Quarterfinal Group Stage, divided into six groups that played in a round-robin. The final standing was based on individual wins and defeats. In the case of a tie between two or more teams after the group stage, the following criteria were used to decide the final classification: 1) number of wins in one-to-one games between the teams; 2) basket average between the teams; 3) general basket average within the group.
 The 6 group winners of the Quarterfinal Group Stage advanced to Semifinal Group Stage, which was played as a single group under the same round-robin rules.
 The group winner and the runner-up of the Semifinal Group Stage qualified for the final, which was played at a predetermined venue.

Quarterfinal group stage

Semifinal group stage

Final

March 25, Sporthalle, Cologne

|}

Awards

FIBA European Champions Cup Finals Top Scorer
 Bruce Flowers ( Squibb Cantù)

References

External links
1981–82 FIBA European Champions Cup
 1981–82 FIBA European Champions Cup
 Men Basketball European Champions Cup 1982
 Champions Cup 1981–82 Line-ups and Stats

EuroLeague seasons
FIBA